Michael Serr (born July 14, 1962) is a German retired football player. He spent 7 seasons in the Bundesliga with 1. FC Kaiserslautern. As of February 2009, he was working as a player agent.

Honours
 Bundesliga champion: 1991
 DFB-Pokal winner: 1990
 DFL-Supercup: 1991

References

External links
 

1962 births
Living people
German footballers
1. FC Kaiserslautern players
1. FC Saarbrücken players
Bundesliga players
Association football goalkeepers
People from Landau
Footballers from Rhineland-Palatinate